Jevstatije I was the sixth Serbian Archbishop, holding the office from 1279 to 1286. He was born in the Budimlje parish, near Berane in Zeta. He took his monastics vows in Zeta, then left for the Hilandar monastery to study and meditate and, where he later became the hegumen (abbot), succeeding Joanikije, holding the office 1162–65. He left the monastery and became the Bishop of Zeta, and later the Serbian Archbishop in 1279, succeeding Joanikije I. He died on 4 January 1286.  His relics were buried in the Monastery of Peć in 1289-1290, after being transferred from the ruined Žiča monastery. The Serbian Orthodox Church commemorates him on 4 January according to the Julian calendar, or 17 January according to the Gregorian calendar.

References

Sources
 

Year of birth missing
1286 deaths
13th-century Serbian people
Eastern Orthodox Christians from Serbia
Serbian saints of the Eastern Orthodox Church
13th-century Christian saints
13th-century Eastern Orthodox bishops
Archbishops of Serbs
Bishops of Montenegro and the Littoral
People of the Kingdom of Serbia (medieval)
Serbs of Montenegro
Burials at the Patriarchate of Peć (monastery)